Lake Yay is a saline lake in Kayseri Province, central Turkey. It is situated in the rural area of Develi ilçe (district).

Description
The lake is the biggest in the Sultan Reedy National Park. It is a shallow lake with an average depth of only .

While it covers a much wider surface during the rainy season, its area fluctuates and it mostly dries up in the summer season. When at low ebb, salt is produced in the lake bed.

References

Landforms of Kayseri Province
Develi District
Yay
Yay